Players and pairs who neither have high enough rankings nor receive wild cards may participate in a qualifying tournament held one week before the annual Wimbledon Tennis Championships.

Seeds

  Nicole Jagerman (qualified)
  Nathalie Guerrée (second round)
  Renata Baranski (second round)
  Anna Földényi (second round)
  Kimiko Date (qualifying competition, lucky loser)
  Belinda Cordwell (second round)
  Louise Field (first round)
  Catherine Suire (qualified)
 n/a
  Petra Kamstra (qualified)
  Tamaka Takagi (first round)
 n/a
  Miriam Oremans (qualified)
  Chanda Rubin (first round)
  Jo-Anne Faull (qualifying competition, lucky loser)
  Isabelle Demongeot (qualified)

Qualifiers

  Nicole Jagerman
  Isabelle Demongeot
  Miriam Oremans
  Catherine Suire
  Els Callens
  Kristine Radford
  Petra Kamstra 
  Rennae Stubbs

Lucky losers

  Kimiko Date
  Jill Hetherington
  Nicole Pratt
  Claudine Toleafoa
  Jo-Anne Faull

Qualifying draw

First qualifier

Second qualifier

Third qualifier

Fourth qualifier

Fifth qualifier

Sixth qualifier

Seventh qualifier

Eighth qualifier

External links

1991 Wimbledon Championships – Women's draws and results at the International Tennis Federation

Women's Singles Qualifying
Wimbledon Championship by year – Women's singles qualifying
Wimbledon Championships